Dawu Sports Stadium is a multi-use, 5,000-capacity all-seater stadium in Dawu Akuapem in the Eastern Region of Ghana, mostly used for association football matches.

Overview 
The Dawu Sports Stadium was built by a  businessman called Seth Yeboah for use by his football team, Dawu Youngstars. However, Dawu youngsters have now been dissolved

In 2008, the stadium was the home venue for the African qualifiers for the Nike Premier Cup competition.

The Dawu sports stadium is currently the home ground for Ghana Premier league sides Dreams Fc and International Allies.

References

Football venues in Ghana
Sports venues in Ghana
Sport in Accra
Buildings and structures in Accra